Parator zonatus, the trilobed-lip barbel, is a species of cyprinid fish found in the Zhujiang River in China and Vietnam.  It is the only member of its genus.

References
 

Cyprinid fish of Asia
Freshwater fish of China
Fish described in 1935